In geometry, a 6-cube is a six-dimensional hypercube with 64 vertices, 192 edges,  240 square faces, 160 cubic cells, 60 tesseract 4-faces, and 12 5-cube 5-faces.

It has Schläfli symbol {4,34}, being composed of 3 5-cubes around each 4-face. It can be called a hexeract,  a portmanteau of tesseract (the 4-cube) with hex for six (dimensions) in Greek. It can also be called a regular dodeca-6-tope or dodecapeton, being a 6-dimensional polytope constructed from 12 regular facets.

Related polytopes

It is a part of an infinite family of polytopes, called hypercubes. The dual of a 6-cube can be called a 6-orthoplex, and is a part of the infinite family of cross-polytopes.

Applying an alternation operation, deleting alternating vertices of the 6-cube, creates another uniform polytope, called a 6-demicube, (part of an infinite family called demihypercubes), which has 12 5-demicube and 32 5-simplex facets.

As a configuration
This configuration matrix represents the 6-cube. The rows and columns correspond to vertices, edges, faces, cells, 4-faces and 5-faces. The diagonal numbers say how many of each element occur in the whole 6-cube. The nondiagonal numbers say how many of the column's element occur in or at the row's element.

Cartesian coordinates 
Cartesian coordinates for the vertices of a 6-cube centered at the origin and edge length 2 are
 (±1,±1,±1,±1,±1,±1)
while the interior of the same consists of all points (x0, x1, x2, x3, x4, x5) with −1 < xi < 1.

Construction 

There are three Coxeter groups associated with the 6-cube, one regular, with the C6 or [4,3,3,3,3] Coxeter group, and a half symmetry (D6) or [33,1,1] Coxeter group. The lowest symmetry construction is based on hyperrectangles or proprisms, cartesian products of lower dimensional hypercubes.

Projections

Related polytopes
The 6-cube is 6th in a series of hypercube:

This polytope is one of 63 uniform 6-polytopes generated from the B6 Coxeter plane, including the regular 6-cube or 6-orthoplex.

References 

 Coxeter, H.S.M. Regular Polytopes, (3rd edition, 1973), Dover edition,  p. 296, Table I (iii): Regular Polytopes, three regular polytopes in n-dimensions (n>=5)

External links 
 

 Multi-dimensional Glossary: hypercube Garrett Jones

6-polytopes
Articles containing video clips